Acquaviva delle Fonti is a railway station in Acquaviva delle Fonti, Italy. The station is located on the Bari–Taranto railway. The train services are operated by Trenitalia.

Train services
The station is served by the following service(s):

Local services (Treno regionale) Bari - Gioia del Colle - Taranto

References

Railway stations in Apulia
Buildings and structures in the Province of Bari